Fernando José "Corby" Corbató (July 1, 1926 – July 12, 2019) was a prominent American computer scientist, notable as a pioneer in the development of time-sharing operating systems.

Career
Corbató was born on July 1, 1926 in Oakland, California, to Hermenegildo Corbató, a Spanish literature professor from Villarreal, Spain, and Charlotte (née Carella Jensen) Corbató. In 1930 the Corbató family moved to Los Angeles for Hermenegildo's job at the University of California, Los Angeles.

In 1943, Corbató enrolled at UCLA, but due to World War II he was recruited by the Navy during his first year. During the war, Corbató "debug[ged] an incredible array of equipment", inspiring his future career.

Corbató left the Navy in 1946, enrolled at the California Institute of Technology, and received a bachelor's degree in physics in 1950. He then earned a PhD in physics from the Massachusetts Institute of Technology in 1956. He joined MIT's Computation Center immediately upon graduation, became a professor in 1965, and stayed at MIT until he retired.

The first time-sharing system he was associated with was known as the MIT Compatible Time-Sharing System (CTSS), an early version of which was demonstrated in 1961.  Corbató is credited with the first use of passwords to secure access to files on a large computer system, though he later claimed that this rudimentary security method had proliferated and became unmanageable.

The experience with developing CTSS led to a second project, Multics, which was adopted by General Electric for its high-end computer systems (later acquired by Honeywell). Multics pioneered many concepts now used in modern operating systems, including a hierarchical file system, ring-oriented security, access control lists, single-level store, dynamic linking, and extensive on-line reconfiguration for reliable service. Multics, while not particularly commercially successful in itself, directly inspired Ken Thompson to develop Unix, the direct descendants of which are still in extremely wide use; Unix also served as a direct model for many other subsequent operating system designs.

Awards
Among many awards, Corbató received the Turing Award in 1990, "for his pioneering work in organizing the concepts and leading the development of the general-purpose, large-scale, time-sharing and resource-sharing computer systems".

In 2012, he was made a Fellow of the Computer History Museum "for his pioneering work on timesharing and the Multics operating system".

Legacy
Corbató is sometimes known for "Corbató's Law" which states:
The number of lines of code a programmer can write in a fixed period of time is the same, independent of the language used.
Corbató is recognized as helping to create the first computer password.

Personal life and death
Corbató married programmer Isabel Blandford in 1962; she died in 1973.

Corbató had a second wife, Emily (née Gluck); two daughters, Carolyn Corbató Stone and Nancy Corbató, by his late wife Isabel; two step-sons, David Gish and Jason Gish; a brother, Charles; and five grandchildren.

Corbató lived on Temple Street in West Newton, MA.  He died on July 12, 2019 in Newburyport, Massachusetts, at the age of 93 due to complications from diabetes.

Publications
 F. J. Corbató, M. M. Daggett, R. C. Daley, An Experimental Time-Sharing System (IFIPS 1962) is a good description of CTSS
 F. J. Corbató (editor), The Compatible Time-Sharing System: A Programmer's Guide (M.I.T. Press, 1963)
 F. J. Corbató, V. A. Vyssotsky, Introduction and Overview of the Multics System (AFIPS 1965) is a good introduction to Multics
 
 F. J. Corbató, C. T. Clingen, J. H. Saltzer, Multics -- The First Seven Years (AFIPS, 1972) is an excellent review, after a considerable period of use and improvement
 F. J. Corbató, C. T. Clingen, A Managerial View of the Multics System Development ("Conference on Research Directions in Software Technology", Providence, Rhode Island, 1977) is a fascinating look at what it was like to manage such a large software project
 F. J. Corbató,  On Building Systems That Will Fail (Turing Award Lecture, 1991)
 F. J. Corbató, A paging experiment with the Multics system. Included in a Festschrift published in honor of Prof. P.M. Morse. MIT Press, Cambridge, Mass., 1969.

See also
Incompatible Timesharing System
Multilevel feedback queue

References

Further reading
 Dag Spicer, "Fernando Corbató: Time-Sharing Pioneer, Part 1", IEEE Annals of the History of Computing, vol.37, no. 4, pp. 5-9, Oct.-Dec. 2015, doi:10.1109/MAHC.2015.81
 Dag Spicer, "Fernando Corbató: Time-Sharing Pioneer, Part 2", IEEE Annals of the History of Computing, vol.38, no. 1, pp. 75-79, Jan.-Mar. 2016, doi:10.1109/MAHC.2016.7

External links

 Oral history interview with Fernando J. Corbató at Charles Babbage Institute, University of Minnesota.  Corbató discusses computer science research, especially time-sharing, at the Massachusetts Institute of Technology (MIT).
 Oral history interview with Fernando J. Corbató at the Computer History Museum in Mountain View, CA.  Fernando Corbató reviews his early educational and naval experiences in the Eddy program during World War II, including the Compatible Time-Sharing System (CTSS), Project MAC, and Multics.
 Computer Networks: The Heralds of Resource Sharing, documentary ca. 1972 about the ARPANET. Includes footage of Fernando Corbató.
 , Corbato demonstrates MIT's Compatible Time-Sharing System.
 Corby, by Tom Van Vleck on the Multics website. A background sketch that includes many further links and several photographs.
 Corby Memorial - Transcript of the memorial held at MIT.

1926 births
2019 deaths
Turing Award laureates
California Institute of Technology alumni
Fellows of the Association for Computing Machinery
MIT Department of Physics alumni
Massachusetts Institute of Technology faculty
Members of the United States National Academy of Engineering
Multics people
Time-sharing
Writers from Oakland, California
Military personnel from California
American people of Spanish descent
United States Navy personnel of World War II